The Herts Senior Cup, officially titled the Hertfordshire County Football Association Senior Challenge Cup, is the oldest County-based football Cup competition based exclusively in Hertfordshire, England. It was first contested in the 1886-87 season and won by Hoddesdon Town. It has been contested every year since except for the years 1915 to 1918 when it was suspended during World War I. It is usually contested by the twenty-two most senior Clubs in the County, though this number has been higher and lower in previous years.

Finals have nearly always been staged at a neutral venue in the County, apart from a few seasons in the mid-1960s when the final was played over two-legs. Since the 2004-05 season, finals have been staged at the Herts FA's headquarters at the County Ground, Letchworth Garden City, with the exception of 2010-11, when the final was moved to Underhill as the final was contested between two Football League clubs, Barnet and Stevenage, prompting safety concerns. 

The current holders are Cheshunt.

Results 
Source:

 * After extra time
 ^ Penalties

Results by team

Notes

References 

County Cup competitions
Recurring sporting events established in 1886
Football in Hertfordshire